Manitou Island is a small island in Lake Superior, off the northeastern tip of the Keweenaw Peninsula in the U.S. state of Michigan. It is part of Grant Township, in Keweenaw County. Manitou has seen limited impact from human activity because of its remote location and the often-treacherous waters caused by a strong current at the peninsula's tip. It is mostly forested, with scattered bogs and an inland lake known as "Perch Lake". Dense underbrush can make travel around the island rather difficult, though a few unimproved trails do exist. The Keweenaw Land Trust protects  of the island as the Manitou Island Light Station Preserve.

History
Test pits have been found on the island, hinting at a short-lived past as a possible mining site. Though trees abound, Manitou's remoteness and its lack of quality timber make logging economically unfeasible. Commercial fisherman have used the island as a camping site in the past, staying overnight on the south beaches while setting their nets in the area. Today public access is facilitated by a timber and rock crib dock near the old lighthouse.

Beginning in 2002, Manitou Island became the focus of an effort by local birdwatchers to explore and document the various avian species there. Approximately 203 separate species have been recorded, including large numbers of migratory raptors and waterbirds. Observers have also compiled a "list of over 80 species as at least possible breeders."   Organized observations by the Keweenaw Audubon Society are now happening regularly. Efforts to investigate this unique habitat and its feathered residents are ongoing, in conjunction with the conservation activities of the Land Trust.

The large number of avian visitors should be understood in the larger context of other sites around Michigan and the Great Lakes.  This would include Peninsula Point Light, Tawas Point State Park and Whitefish Point Light/Whitefish Point Bird Observatory (which contains a lighthouse configured like this one).  Important Bird Areas are found in many parts of Michigan.

Lighthouses

Manitou Island Light Station

Manitou Island's most important use to date has been the Manitou Island Light Station on its eastern tip. First built in 1849, this lighthouse is still in use, although it is unmanned and solar powered. The island is presently in the custody of the Keweenaw Land Trust, which acquired the Light Station and surrounding land in 2004. The new owners have announced plans to encourage public use of Manitou through camping, rock collecting, hiking, boating, kayaking, fishing, and sightseeing at the old light station, while preserving the island's unspoiled scenery and natural habitats.

Gull Rock

Gull Rock, a tiny islet about one-half mile off Manitou's western tip, contains a historic lighthouse built in 1867 which still functions (like the Manitou light) as an unattended navigational aid. Recently a local preservation society acquired the islet and its dilapidated light station, with a view to its ultimate restoration.

References

Further reading

 Bibliography on Michigan lighthouses.
 Crompton, Samuel Willard  & Michael J. Rhein, The Ultimate Book of Lighthouses (2002) ; .
 Hyde, Charles K., and Ann and John Mahan. The Northern Lights: Lighthouses of the Upper Great Lakes.  Detroit: Wayne State University Press, 1995.    .
 Jones, Ray & Bruce Roberts, American Lighthouses (Globe Pequot, September 1, 1998, 1st Ed.) ; .
 Jones, Ray,The Lighthouse Encyclopedia, The Definitive Reference (Globe Pequot, January 1, 2004, 1st ed.) ; .
Lynn, Bruce. "A Light is on in the Graveyard [Whitefish Point]." Lighthouse Digest (Aug 1997), pp. 1–3.
 Noble, Dennis, Lighthouses & Keepers: U. S. Lighthouse Service and Its Legacy (Annapolis: U. S. Naval Institute Press, 1997). ; .
 Oleszewski, Wes, Great Lakes Lighthouses, American and Canadian: A Comprehensive Directory/Guide to Great Lakes Lighthouses, (Gwinn, Michigan: Avery Color Studios, Inc., 1998) .
 Penrod, John, Lighthouses of Michigan, (Berrien Center, Michigan: Penrod/Hiawatha, 1998)  .
 
 Putnam, George R., Lighthouses and Lightships of the United States, (Boston: Houghton Mifflin Co., 1933).
 Splake, T. Kilgore. Superior Land Lights. Battle Creek, MI: Angst Productions, 1984.
 United States Coast Guard, Aids to Navigation, (Washington, DC: U. S. Government Printing Office, 1945).
 
 
 Wagner, John L., Michigan Lighthouses: An Aerial Photographic Perspective, (East Lansing, Michigan: John L. Wagner, 1998)  .
 Wargin, Ed, Legends of Light: A Michigan Lighthouse Portfolio (Ann Arbor Media Group, 2006).  .
 Wright, Larry and Wright, Patricia, Great Lakes Lighthouses Encyclopedia Hardback (Erin: Boston Mills Press, 2006) .

External links
 Manitou Island Light Station Preserve - Keweenaw Land Trust
 Bird Survey of Manitou Island, includes several photos of the island.
 Interactive map on Michigan lighthouses, Detroit News.
 Interactive map of lighthouses in eastern Lake Superior.
 Lighthouse Central, Manitou Island Lighthouse The Ultimate Guide to Upper Michigan Lighthouses by Jerry Roach. (Publisher: Bugs Publishing LLC - 2007).  .
 
 Manitou Island Lighthouse at Terry Pepper, Seeing The Light.
 National Park Service Marine Heritage Project, Inventory of Historic Light Stations, Manitou Island Light.
  Manitou Island Light.
 
Wagner, John L., Beacons Shining in the Night, Michigan Lighthouse Bibliography, Chronology, History, and Photographs, Clarke Historical Library, Central, Michigan University.
 
 Yahoo Images: Manitou Island More photos of Manitou Island, including the lighthouse (be sure not to confuse images of "Manitou Island" with those from "North Manitou Island" or "South Manitou Island," which are both in Lake Michigan!).

Protected areas of Keweenaw County, Michigan
Islands of Keweenaw County, Michigan
Uninhabited islands of Michigan
Islands of Lake Superior in Michigan
Nature reserves in Michigan